Jason Eric Whateley (born 18 November 1990) is an Australian professional boxer. As an amateur, he competed in the men's heavyweight event at the 2016 Summer Olympics. Whateley said that he is a supporter of the Australian football team Hawthorn Football Club.

Professional boxing record

References

External links
 
 
 
 
 

1990 births
Living people
Sportsmen from Victoria (Australia)
Heavyweight boxers
Cruiserweight boxers
Australian male boxers
Olympic boxers of Australia
Boxers at the 2016 Summer Olympics
Commonwealth Games medallists in boxing
Commonwealth Games silver medallists for Australia
Boxers at the 2018 Commonwealth Games
Medallists at the 2018 Commonwealth Games